Monroe Manor is a census-designated place (CDP) in Monroe Township, Middlesex County, New Jersey, United States. It is in the southernmost part of Middlesex County and consists of the developments of Monroe Manor and Monroe Place. It is bordered to the south by Millstone Township in Monmouth County and to the west by the Renaissance at Monroe development. New Jersey Route 33 forms the northern border of the CDP, leading west  to Hightstown and east  to Freehold.

The area was first listed as a CDP prior to the 2020 census.

Demographics

References 

Census-designated places in Middlesex County, New Jersey
Census-designated places in New Jersey
Monroe Township, Middlesex County, New Jersey